Winrock Town Center is an open-air mixed-use development under construction in Albuquerque, New Mexico, United States. The center is anchored by two Dillard's locations and a Regal 16-screen IMAX and RPX Theatre. The town center is located on the site of the original Winrock Shopping Center, which opened in 1961 as the first regional shopping mall in New Mexico.

Pre-Winrock history (1920-1961) 
In June 1920, the University of New Mexico purchased a  lot on what was then known as Albuquerque's East Mesa. The original intent UNM had with purchasing this lot was to transform it into a garden to produce vegetables for residential students. However, this idea was scrapped and the lot was left empty.

About three decades later, the University of New Mexico began to sell off plots of its East Mesa site to residential developers, with the first  going to Ed Snow in 1953 and another  to Dale Bellemah in 1956. This paved the way for new subdivisions and a new large population movement to this new part of Albuquerque. Soon enough, this would result in the need for the establishment of a retail area. This led to a 1958 meeting between then-UNM President Tom Popejoy and Winthrop Rockefeller, where they negotiated building a new regional shopping mall to be built on some of the last plots of UNM's East Mesa land.

Winrock Shopping Center (1961–2011) 
Winrock Shopping Center opened on March 1, 1961, on a  lot near the planned Coronado Freeway. The $10 million project was a joint venture between the University of New Mexico, which owned the land, and soon-to-be Arkansas governor Winthrop Rockefeller, who was also responsible for construction of the Bank of New Mexico Building around the same time. Architect Victor Gruen, who was a refugee from Nazi-occupied Austria, designed the mall. Winrock was New Mexico's first regional shopping center and was viewed as a symbol of progress and modernity, attracting around 30,000 visitors on its first day of operation. The original tenants included Montgomery Ward, JCPenney, S.S. Kresge, and Safeway, with a Fedway store opening shortly afterward. Fox Winrock Theater, a freestanding movie theater off of Indian School Road, and an attached motor hotel opened in 1963.

In March 1965, the rival Coronado Center was dedicated a short distance away. However, Winrock remained profitable for many years. Dillard's established their first store there in late 1971, when they rebranded the existing Fedway location. Soon after, a new store was built as a replacement. In 1971, Winrock was featured in the American International Pictures release Bunny O'Hare, which starred Bette Davis and Ernest Borgnine. In the film, the two ride a motorcycle through the mall while escaping from a bank robbery.

Winrock was built as an open-air mall with a screened canopy roof to protect shoppers from the elements, a first for New Mexico. This renovation also added the distinctive burnt-orange pyramid at the east end of the mall. Other significant expansions took place in 1967, 1972, and 1981, and 1984, which brought an upper floor to Winrock. At its peak in the mid-1980s, the mall had  of gross leasable area and 130 stores.

Bealls was added in 1985. This space later became Oshman's and, later, Sports Authority. Also, the Fox Winrock Theater was demolished to make way for a new freestanding movie theater on the site, known as the Winrock 6, which opened on October 3, 1986.

Winrock received its largest renovation yet in 1990–94, remodeling the east atrium and Montgomery Ward store, demolishing an underused wing at the west end of the mall, and adding a second Dillard's on the site of the former JCPenney store (vacated in 1990). The new Dillard's location housed men's and children's clothing, electronics, and housewares, while the women's clothing and cosmetics departments were kept at the original store.

Beginning in the late 1990s, the mall began a steep decline and vacancy rates began to climb. By 2005, tenants' leases were not renewed in anticipation of redevelopment of the property. That same year, the attached motor hotel Winrock Inn closed. By the turn of the century, the mall was clearly dead and decaying rapidly. The only remaining stores were the two Dillard's, Bed, Bath and Beyond, and a Sports Authority, each of which owned their respective spaces.

In 1999, Winrock Center was among the three New Mexico shopping malls, with the two others being Coronado Center and Cottonwood Mall, involved in a free speech lawsuit. Their policies on activity regulation were challenged by the SouthWest Organizing Project and ACLU after protesters attempted to hand out leaflets at the malls. This case was dismissed. The 1972 case Lloyd Corp. v. Tanner states that shopping malls may limit speech activities (such as distribution of pamphlets) on premises.

The mostly abandoned shopping center was used as a set for the filming of the 2009 American comedy film Observe and Report and the 2013 American Mystery film/Thriller Odd Thomas

Redevelopment

2002-2011 

In July 2002, New Jersey based PruWinrock LLC, the firm that owned the property, announced new development and proposed “an open-air large-format community center.” This failed incarnation would have included high-end retail, a movie theater, and apartment condos. The new center would have included  of retail space. Groundbreaking for phase I was to begin in 2003 and be completed two years later. PruWinrock's approval was denied by the planning commission for additional on and off-ramps to neighboring I-40 on the grounds that they had not completed a required traffic study.

Over the following years there were numerous false starts. Increasing construction and material costs were cited as a major factor in the delays. In 2007, PruWinrock sold the property to Albuquerque-based Goodman Realty Group for an undisclosed amount. Progress on the redevelopment project was slow. The new developers held community meetings to showcase the new plans in an effort to garner their approval and ask for their support. The presented master plan included  of new office, retail, restaurant, residential units, and a hotel. Also included were a  movie theater (including IMAX), a grocery store, parks, plazas, and over 6000 parking spaces.

2012-present

In February 2012, Goodman Realty Group announced that it had signed long-term leases with three major restaurants – Genghis Grill, BJ's Restaurant and Brewhouse, and Dave and Busters – to begin construction in the spring. Demolition of the Winrock Center mall began in May 2012. Winrock Inn was the first part of the mall to be demolished because it attracted criminal activity. And the Winrock 6, then branded as a United Artists theater under the ownership of Regal Entertainment Group, closed its doors in 2013 and was demolished that same year. BJ's and Genghis Grill both opened in 2012, while Dave and Buster's, which took over the site of the original Winrock 6, opened on November 3, 2014. Adjacent to BJ's, a Joe's Crab Shack was proposed, which would've been their first location in New Mexico. However, they withdrew in 2015. Instead, a Red Robin opened there in March 2017.

The first phase of the project, a Regal 16-screen IMAX and RPX Theatre, had its grand opening on November 15, 2013.

Rumors have speculated about the merging of the two Dillard's stores into a single, new stand-alone building that would be built west of the current Women's store and north of the current Men's store. However, neither the manager of the store nor the developer have said anything about it since 2014. The most recent site plan from September 28, 2017 shows the two Dillard's stores staying in their current spaces.

The future Winrock Town Center may also include "ABQ Active", featuring a sports training center, rock climbing, indoor scuba diving, zip lining and indoor sky diving. This will all be dependent upon the economy and success of the new Winrock project.

As of 2015, the Bed Bath & Beyond store has closed and moved to a new space near I-40 and San Mateo. Initially, Sports Authority relocated to a new space that partially replaced it. However, it closed shortly after the move as Sports Authority filed for bankruptcy in March 2016 and closed all of its stores in August 2016.  A further proposal includes relocating the two Dillard's to a larger, singular store. Nordstrom Rack, DSW Shoe Warehouse, and other stores opened in Fall 2016. PetSmart opened a store adjacent to Ulta Beauty in November 2017.

The Corner at Winrock, a 22,000-square-foot building located on the southeast corner of Indian School and Uptown Loop behind Garduno's and Genghis Grill, began construction in 2016 and was completed in 2017. Sauce Pizza & Wine, a Scottsdale, Arizona-based chain, was the first tenant to open at The Corner in July 2017. A new Firehouse Subs location adjacent to Sauce Pizza & Wine opened on September 4, 2017. Takumi Restaurant, a new upscale Japanese restaurant from the people behind Azuma Sushi & Teppan, opened in November 2017, along with a Mark Pardo Salon Spa. Future tenants of The Corner include Old Town Olive, Village Nail, and Burger 21.

References

External links 
 Deadmalls.com: Winrock Center
 Winrock Town Center

Buildings and structures in Albuquerque, New Mexico
Shopping malls in New Mexico
Shopping malls established in 1961
Economy of Albuquerque, New Mexico